Jaroslav Drobný (born 18 October 1979) is a Czech former professional footballer who played as a goalkeeper and who works as goalkeeping coach for Bayern Munich II. At international level, he has represented the Czech Republic. Drobný has previously played for Panionios, ADO Den Haag, VfL Bochum, Ipswich Town, Hertha BSC, Hamburger SV, Werder Bremen, and Fortuna Düsseldorf.

Club career
Drobný's first club was local club SK Chrudim. In his first season, he signed a contract with Chrudium's rivals FC Vítkovice. He joined First Division club S.K. České Budějovice in 1999 where he spent his first two professional seasons.

In 2001, he was transferred to Panionios in the Alpha Ethniki, the first tier in Greece.

In 2005, Drobný was spotted by Fulham, and in the summer, the club having sold Edwin van der Sar, he was bought by the West London club. However, he was injured shortly after his arrival, and upon returning to fitness failed to get into the team. He was loaned for half a season to the Dutch club ADO Den Haag. When he returned his contract was terminated by mutual consent in August 2006, without Drobný having played a first-team game for the club.

On 27 October 2006, he joined Ipswich Town on a short-term deal, but failed to make a first team appearance.

On 23 January 2007, Drobný was loaned to VfL Bochum. He immediately took over the position in goal from Danish keeper Peter Skov-Jensen. On 27 January 2007, he made his Bundesliga debut with VfL Bochum against Mainz.

Drobný moved to Hertha BSC for the 2007–08 season. After a strong 2008–09 season, in which Hertha lead the Bundesliga for five matchdays, Hertha finished in last placed in the 2009–10 season, and he left the club to join Hamburger SV.

In June 2016, Drobný joined Werder Bremen on a year-long contract. In the 2016–17 season, he made 10 league appearances. During the season he was kept out of action by injuries to his hand and his shoulder as well as by a three-match suspension from a red card received on matchday 17. In June 2017, he agreed to extend his contract at the club. A further year-long contract extension followed in July 2018.

In January 2019, moved to Werder Bremen's league rivals Fortuna Düsseldorf.

In October 2019, Drobný returned to the Czech Republic joining former club Dynamo České Budějovice. In May 2021 Drobný confirmed his end in Dynamo České Budějovice.

International career
Drobný was part of the Czech side which won the UEFA U-21 Championship in 2002. Drobný has played 16 times for the Czech national team's under-21 side, but his opportunities have been limited in the full squad. On 11 February 2009, Drobný made his debut for the senior team in a 0–0 draw against Morocco.

Coaching career
In October 2021 Drobný was appointed interim goalkeeping coach at Bayern Munich II after Walter Junghans underwent knee surgery.

References

External links

 
 
 
 
 
 

1979 births
Living people
People from Počátky
Czech footballers
Czech Republic youth international footballers
Czech Republic under-21 international footballers
Czech Republic international footballers
Association football goalkeepers
Olympic footballers of the Czech Republic
Footballers at the 2000 Summer Olympics
Czech First League players
Super League Greece players
Eredivisie players
Bundesliga players
SK Dynamo České Budějovice players
Panionios F.C. players
Fulham F.C. players
ADO Den Haag players
Ipswich Town F.C. players
VfL Bochum players
Hertha BSC players
Hamburger SV players
SV Werder Bremen players
Fortuna Düsseldorf players
UEFA Euro 2012 players
Czech expatriate footballers
Czech expatriate sportspeople in Greece
Czech expatriate sportspeople in England
Czech expatriate sportspeople in the Netherlands
Czech expatriate sportspeople in Germany
Expatriate footballers in Greece
Expatriate footballers in England
Expatriate footballers in the Netherlands
Expatriate footballers in Germany
Sportspeople from the Vysočina Region